Order of Admiral Ri Sun-sin is an award named for famous Korean naval leader Yi Sun-sin. It was given to Korean People's Navy personnel of North Korea at least during the Korean War. There are two grades of the award. Order of Admiral Ri Sun-sin First Class, and Order of Admiral Ri Sun-sin Second Class.

History

The second class of this award was given 22 times during the Korean War while the first class version was not given. The award has been assumed to have been discontinued at an unknown date. Photographic evidence indicated the award was given for some years after the war, as a medal with serial number 113 exists.

References

Further reading

Orders, decorations, and medals of North Korea